William Mordecai Cooke Sr. (December 11, 1823 – April 14, 1863) was a prominent Confederate politician.

Biography
William Mordecai Cooke was born in Portsmouth, Virginia on December 11, 1823.

He earned a law degree at the University of Virginia in 1843, and later moved to Missouri, where he briefly served as a judge.

He married Elise von Phul in St. Louis on November 17, 1846, and they had seven children.

He represented the state in the Provisional Confederate Congress in 1861 to 1862, and in the First Confederate Congress from 1862 to 1863. He died in office, in Petersburg, Virginia on April 14, 1863.

References

1823 births
1863 deaths
Deputies and delegates to the Provisional Congress of the Confederate States
Members of the Confederate House of Representatives from Missouri
19th-century American politicians
Politicians from Portsmouth, Virginia